Beechwoods Cemetery is a non-denominational cemetery located in New Rochelle, New York. The cemetery was incorporated in 1854.

Notable interments
 Medal of Honor recipients:
 Robert Temple Emmet (1854–1936), Lieutenant in the American Cavalry, for action in the Indian Wars
 William B. Lewis (1847–1900), US Cavalry sergeant in the Indian Wars
 Others
 Nell Brinkley (1886–1944), the "Queen of Comics" illustrator and artist
 Ruth Chatterton (1892–1961), American actress, novelist and aviator (cremated remains)
 Thaddeus Davids (1810–1894), New York City businessman
William T. Emmet (1869–1918), New York lawyer, Public Service Commissioner
 John Hunter (1788–1852), New York City merchant and landowner
 Lou Jones (1932–2006), 1956 Olympic Gold Medal athlete
 John Q. Underhill (1848–1907), U.S. Congressman
 Max Wertheimer (1880–1943), one of the founders of gestalt psychology

See also 
 Holy Sepulchre Cemetery (New Rochelle, New York)

References

External links
 
 Beechwoods Cemetery, at NyGenWeb
  

Buildings and structures in New Rochelle, New York
Cemeteries in Westchester County, New York
1854 establishments in New York (state)